Dies natalis is Latin for "birthday, anniversary" and may refer to:

 The birthday of an individual, or the anniversary of a founding event, e.g. of a university; see Glossary of ancient Roman religion#dies natalis
 Dies Natalis Solis Invicti, the "birthday" of the Roman solar deity Sol Invictus on December 25
 the annual commemoration of a Christian martyr's death; see Calendar of saints
 Dies Natalis (cantata), a cantata by Gerald Finzi